William Creighton may refer to:

 William Creighton Jr. (1778–1851), attorney, banker and legislator in Ohio
 William Black Creighton (1864–1946), Canadian social reformer
 William Steel Creighton (1902–1973), American myrmecologist and taxonomist
 William Creighton (bishop) (1909–1987), bishop of the Diocese of Washington